Talal Yassine  (born 1 January 1972) is a Lebanese Australian businessman. He is the founder and managing director of Crescent Wealth, Australia's first Islamic wealth management company, that launched the country's first Islamic superannuation fund, the Crescent Wealth Superannuation Fund, and the country's first Islamic stock market index, the Thomson Reuters Crescent Wealth Islamic Australia index.

He also is the founder of Crescent Finance, Crescent Institute Ltd , Crescent Foundation and Crescent Think Tank.

He holds an Honorary Professorial Fellowship at the Crawford School of Public Policy within the Australian National University College of Asia and the Pacific and serves as an Adjunct Professor in the School of Business at Western Sydney University.

Additionally, he served as Chairman of the Council for Australian-Arab Relations for the Department of Foreign Affairs and Trade (DFAT), a member of the board of DFAT's Australia Malaysia Institute, and a member of Australian Multicultural Council.

For his work, he was named Professional of the Year in 2012 and Man of the Year in 2016 in the Australian Muslim Achievement Awards. In 2010, he was awarded a Medal of the Order of Australia (OAM) for his contribution to the country's business, education, and multicultural community.

Early life 
He is the eldest of eight children of Lebanese Muslims Ali, a poor tobacco farmer, and Fatma Yassine from the rural north of Lebanon. He was four years old when his family migrated to the western suburbs of Sydney, Australia in 1977 to escape the war in their country of origin. His father worked in a factory while his mother looked after the six boys and two girls. Education was prioritised in the household, although neither parent was highly educated and the family struggled financially. All of the children are professionals and have about 30 degrees between them.

Attending Granville Boys High School from 1984 to 1990, he was elected as school captain and dreamed of becoming a lawyer, practicing the profession in the local community. At first, he went to study at the University of Sydney, then transferred to Macquarie University where he graduated with a Arts degree and law degree. He holds a Master of Laws from the University of Sydney and a Master of Business Administration from Deakin University.

In an interview by the Australia Broadcasting Corporation's Radio National on 22 July 2018 Yassine said that he's married with three daughters and a son.

Career 
Yassine started working at the law firm Dunhill Madden Butler, which later merged with the accounting company Price Waterhouse Coopers in 2000. Later, he entered politics by putting his name down for Australian Labour Party's (ALP) preselection for the legislative seat of Auburn in 2001.  ALP Premier Bob Carr, in his book, Run For Your Life, said that the party passed over Yassine amidst intense anti-Lebanese, anti-Muslim sentiments after a series of gang rape attacks were committed against women in Sydney by Lebanese Australian youths led by serial rapist Bilal Skaf a year before. Carr later characterised the decision as unfair and unjust to Yassine. However, Yassine stated in the ABC's RN interview that he was fortunate he did not push through with politics then as anti-Islamic rhetoric intensified when weeks after the 2001 election, the September 11 attacks occurred.

Later, he worked in corporate finance and technical real estate divisions for the investment bank and fund manager Babcock & Brown for two years and quit before the company collapsed in 2009. Together with Ben Keneally, spouse of former New South Wales premier Kristina Kenneally, he co-founded the Australian division of electric car company, Better Place, and was responsible for the company's business development and strategic partnership. In mid-2011, he stepped back from the day-to-day management of the company while still holding financial interest.

Yassine holds a seat in several corporate boards including as Executive Chairman of the Board at First Quay Capital and LandCorp Australia, Chairman of the Australian Advisory Board of Gulf Australia Corporation, formerly as chairman at Platinum Hearing, and a member of the Australian Arab Dialogue board. In 2017 Yassine was board secretary for The Co-op Bookshop, during which a student-led campaign unsuccessfully attempted to remove the board over accusations of mismanagement, substandard governance, and anti-democratic practices.

Crescent Wealth 
He founded and is the current managing director of Crescent Wealth, Australia's first Islamic wealth manager. In an interview by The Australian on February 15, 2013, he stated that after he failed to find investment products that would satisfy Islamic requirements and were available in Australia to be offered to Muslim investors back then, he established the company in partnership with the U.S. fund manager Saturna Capital to oversee international shares, with Sigma Funds to handle local shares portfolio, and with the Islamic finance subsidiary of HSBC Bank.

On November 2010 it was granted the Australian Securities and Investments Commission's Australian Financial Services Licence. By 2011, it launched Crescent Australian Equity fund with $5.5 million of seed capital from Aon Hewitt targeting the retail market and self-managed superannuation funds (SMSF) in particular. Other financial products include the Crescent Islamic Cash Management Fund, the Crescent Diversified Property Fund, and Crescent International Equity Fund.

The company also launched Crescent Wealth Superannuation Fund, the country's first Islamic superannuation fund, on December 17, 2012. Complying with Islamic guidelines, it does not invest in alcohol, gambling, pornography, weapons, pork, and financial stocks like banks due to a ban on interest charges.

In February 2012 Crescent Wealth in partnership with Thomson Reuters launched the Thomson Reuters Crescent Wealth Islamic Australia index, Australia's first Islamic equities index.

Civil service 
Yassine's works in civil service were as a member of the boards of Sydney Ports, Sydney West Area Health Service, the New South Wales Casino Control Authority, and New South Wales Casino Liquor & Gaming Authority. Moreover, he served as non-executive director on the board of Australian Postal Corporation since 2 August 2012 until August 2015.

He also was a member of the Council for Australian-Arab Relations for the Department of Foreign Affairs and Trade (DFAT) for four years, serving as Chairman for three years, a member of the board of DFAT's Australia Malaysia Institute, and a member of the Australian Multicultural Council.

Academe and philanthropy 
He is an adjunct Business School professor at the University of Western Sydney and currently serves as an honorary professorial fellow at Crawford School of Public Policy within The Australian National University. He was a board member of the Whitlam Institute (within Western Sydney University) as well as Macquarie University.

According to the Australian Charities and Not-for-profits Commission, he is affiliated the following philanthropic organisations: Crescent Foundation Fund Trust, Islamic Museum of Sydney Limited, Media Diversity Australia Limited, The Trustee for Whitlam Institute within Western Sydney University Trust, and Whitlam Institute Within Western Sydney University Foundation Council Board.

Recognition 
He received a Medal of the Order of Australia in 2010 for his services to business, education, and multicultural community. He received the Professional of the Year Award in 2012 from Australian Muslim Achievement Awards. Also, he won the Man of the Year Award on the 2016 Australian Muslim Achievement Awards, with Crescent Wealth winning Business of the Year Award and Event of the Year Award. During the 24th Sir Syed Day organised by Aligarh Muslim University Alumni of Australia on 11 February 2017 he was given recognition for his outstanding contribution to the community. He was included in The Muslim 500: The World's 500 Most Influential Muslims in 2016, 2017 and 2018.

Personal life  
In an interview by the Australian Broadcasting Corporation's Radio National on 22 July 2018, Yassine said that he is married with three daughters and a son.

References

External links 
Official website

1972 births
Living people
20th-century Australian businesspeople
21st-century Australian businesspeople
Lebanese emigrants to Australia
Recipients of the Medal of the Order of Australia
Australian Muslims
Macquarie University alumni
University of Sydney alumni
20th-century Australian lawyers
21st-century Australian lawyers
Australian philanthropists